Elmrahu is an island belonging to the country of Estonia. The island is located west of the island Külalaid and is just off the coast of the much larger island Hiiumaa

See also
 List of islands of Estonia

References

Islands of Estonia
Hiiumaa Parish